USS Camanche was a  monitor that was prefabricated at Jersey City, New Jersey by Donahue, Ryan and Secor for the sum of $613,164.98 ($ in present day terms). She was disassembled and shipped around Cape Horn in the sailing ship Aquila to San Francisco, California.  Aquila arrived in San Francisco on 10 November 1863 but sank at her wharf in 30 feet of water on 14 November 1863 as a result of storm damage and a collision with another ship. The monitor's parts were salvaged and she was launched on 14 November 1864. Camanche was commissioned in May 1865, Lieutenant Commander Charles J. McDougal in command.

Commissioned just after the end of the Civil War, for more than a year—until the arrival of the larger  monitor —Camanche was the only U.S. ironclad on the Pacific coast, and she was one of but two stationed there for nearly 25 years.

Camanches career was a quiet one, with the ship generally maintained in decommissioned status at the Mare Island Navy Yard, in northern San Francisco Bay. She was the California Naval Militia's training ship in 1896–97 and appears to have been reactivated for a few months in 1898, during the Spanish–American War, for coastal defense purposes.

Camanche was sold on 22 March 1899 for the sum of 6,581.25 dollars. According to page 10 of the San Francisco Call dated November 20, 1899, Camanche had her machinery, her weapons and her armor removed by the Union Iron Works in Oakland and she was converted into a collier, hauling coal. Her first voyage as a collier occurred on November 19, 1899. Photographic evidence and local records indicate she remained in the San Francisco area hauling coal for almost 40 years after that. On March 5, 1937 a California newspaper the "Sausalito News" reported on the old monitors fate: "....So the old craft lay at her old home until a local coal concern bought her for a song, and converted her into a coal barge. She did duty until oil and gas took the place of coal and is now lying at the east end of the Bethlehem shipyard, a useless forgotten hulk. Her contract price was $400,000.00".

References

Bibliography

 
 Additional technical data from

External links

 navsource.org: USS Camanche
 hazegray.org: USS Camanche
 (http://www.navsource.org/archives/01/camanche.htm)

 

Passaic-class monitors
Ships built in New Jersey
Ships built in San Francisco
1864 ships
Spanish–American War monitors of the United States
Maritime incidents in November 1863